Angela Addison (born 9 December 1999) is an English professional footballer who plays as a forward for Charlton Athletic playing in England's FA Women's Championship.

Club career

C&K Basildon 
Addison debuted for C&K Basildon's senior team in their 2016–17 FA Women's Premier League season, making 16 appearances and scoring 11 goals. In the 2017–18 FA WPL season, Addison's final season with C&K Basildon, she made 26 appearances and scored 23 goals across all competitions. After the season concluded Addison joined former WPL opponents Tottenham Hotspur, moving up to the FA Women's Championship and playing semi-professional football for the first time.

Tottenham Hotspur 
Addison signed with Tottenham Hotspur in July 2018, in the leadup to the club's second season in the second division. She made her first appearance for the club on 19 September 2018 in a match away to Leicester City as a substitute for fellow midfielder Sarah Wiltshire. Later in the season during Spurs' home fixture against Leicester City, she once again was used as a substitute and this time scored the game-winning goal during stoppage time. This feat and her previous performances that month saw her nominated for FA Women's Championship Player of the Month award for February. She scored six goals in 19 matches during the 2018–19 FA Women's Championship season and helped Spurs secure promotion to the FA Women's Super League for the first time.

In July 2019 it was announced that Addison was among the players Tottenham retained from their Championship squad for their debut WSL season. This was her first professional football contract. Addison scored her first professional hat-trick vs Lewes in the FA Women's League Cup on the 11th of December 2019. The hat-trick was completed in four minutes and helped Tottenham to a 6–0 victory.

On 26 February 2021 Addison signed a new contract with Spurs through the end of the 2022 with an option to extend for another year. Addison scored her second professional hat-trick in Spurs' 11–0 win over Watford in the League Cup on 17 November 2021.

Following the end of her contract, on the 28 May 2022 Tottenham announced that Addison would be leaving the club along with Josie Green and Rachel Williams. She was at the club for four seasons in which she scored 19 goals in 90 games.

International career 
Addison received her first call up for the England women's national under-21 football team in February 2020. She subsequently had her first cap in a friendly against France's under-20 team on 8 March 2020. In October 2021 Addison received her first call up to the England women's national under-23 football team, but she along with her Spurs teammates were recalled from the camp. The following month Addison made her first appearance at an England under-23 camp.

Personal life 
Angela has a twin sister, Therese, who also plays football. The twins both spent time playing together at C&K Basildon and Tottenham Hotspur. Angela goes by the nickname "A" stemming from the years that herself and Therese, known as "T", played at the same clubs and shared the pitch together.

References

External links 
 Tottenham Hotspur player profile
 
 

1999 births
Living people
Tottenham Hotspur F.C. Women players
English women's footballers
Women's association football forwards